Harajuku Dance Rock is an EP released by An Cafe on March 13, 2009. Available only in North America and certain parts of Europe, "Harajuku Dance Rock" includes seven audio tracks and three music videos on a separate DVD. There is also a full-color booklet with both the Japanese lyrics and the romaji version of the lyrics.

Track listing

An Cafe albums
2009 albums